Magalie Bazekene (born 11 December 1992) is a Congolese handball player for CARA Brazzaville and the Congolese national team.

She represented Congo at the 2021 World Women's Handball Championship in Spain.

References

1992 births
Living people
Congolese female handball players